Holenbrunn is a village of 1000 inhabitants in the Fichtel Mountains. It is part of the town Wunsiedel in Upper Franconia in the state of Bavaria in Germany.

History 

 First mentioned around 1500
 1818 - neighbouring villages (Hauenreuth, Holenbrunn, Juliushammer, Wintersberg and Wintersreuth) were joined to one civil parish
 1877 – Weiden–Oberkotzau railway opened, with a station in Holenbrunn
 1978 – amalgamation with Wunsiedel due to an administration reform

Economy, Infrastructure 

Production facilities for:

 Glas (according to DIN 1249)
 High-voltage insulators

also:

 Agriculture
 Div. business enterprise
 Quarry for Wunsiedel Marble
 Train station (Wunsiedel-Holenbrunn)

References

Wunsiedel